Nickelback is a Canadian hard rock band from Hanna, Alberta. The band was founded in 1995 by vocalist and guitarist Chad Kroeger, guitarist and vocalist Ryan Peake, bassist Mike Kroeger and drummer Brandon Kroeger. After the release of their debut extended play (EP) Hesher, the group released its debut full-length album Curb in 1996, which featured songwriting credits for all four band members as well as producer Jeff Boyd. The State followed in 1998, once again written by all four members of the band. After Brandon Kroeger left the band and was replaced by Ryan Vikedal, Nickelback signed with Roadrunner Records and released their third album Silver Side Up in 2001, supported by lead single "How You Remind Me". The Long Road followed in 2003, again credited to all four band members equally.

Vikedal left the band in early 2005 to be replaced by 3 Doors Down drummer Daniel Adair. All the Right Reasons, the band's first album with Adair, was released in 2005. The album featured several contributions from guest musicians, including ZZ Top guitarist Billy Gibbons on "Follow You Home" and "Rockstar", while a recording of a guitar solo by deceased Pantera and Damageplan guitarist Dimebag Darrell is included on "Side of a Bullet". The band's sixth studio album Dark Horse was released in 2008, featuring songwriting credits for all four band members and the album's producers Robert John "Mutt" Lange and Joey Moi.

Nickelback began working with external songwriters on 2011's Here and Now–country music songwriters Craig Wiseman, Chris Tompkins and Rodney Clawson co-wrote "Lullaby", while The Warren Brothers contributed to "Trying Not to Love You". In the same year, the band contributed a cover of ZZ Top's "Legs" to the tribute album ZZ Top: A Tribute from Friends. The band's 2014 eighth studio album No Fixed Address contained the first featured guest spot in Flo Rida on "Got Me Runnin' Round", as well as a number of writing credits for Josh Ramsay, David Hodges and more. The band released Feed the Machine in 2017, which featured contributions from Hayley Warner, Steph Jones, Ali Tamposi, and Joe Nichols.

Songs

See also
Nickelback discography

Footnotes

References

External links
Nickelback official website
List of Nickelback songs at AllMusic

Nickelback